In March 2021, a group of 14 Asian elephants in China fled from the Pu'er City in the southeastern province of Yunnan. In August they returned to their original sanctuary after a journey of 1300 km. These elephants were the center of attention of the Chinese people and worldwide.

Safety measures
Chinese authorities also set up an emergency committee to ensure the elephants return home safely. For the safe return, the committee has built temporary roads for the elephants, electric fences have been installed, and traps have been set up at various places to keep them on track. They also deployed more than 25,000 police officers to provide food for the 14 elephants and to ensure the safety of residents in their paths, and more than 1,500 vehicles were also earmarked. A force of 360 people in 76 vehicles and nine drones monitored the elephants.

References

2021 in China
Animal migration
Elephants
Nature conservation in China
Yunnan